Mumtaz Hussain is an English solicitor and radio presenter. She is best known for presenting Health and Healing with Mumtaz on RedShift Radio.

Early life
She was born into a Muslim family background. Hussain's father came to the United Kingdom from Bangladesh at the age of 15 or 16. Her mother was 19 when Hussain was born. Her mother is an artist who has exhibited at the Royal Academy of Arts.

As a teenager Hussain had aspirations to be either a doctor or a lawyer. She describes her early self as being the "sensible, academic, hardworking non-rebellious eldest daughter of four siblings" and because of her parents' understanding of the value of a good education she was encouraged to study law at university. She received support from her parents and studied, and went on to qualify as a solicitor.

Career
In 1992, Hussain qualified as a solicitor and worked in family law, commercial, civil litigation, wills, crime and personal injury. She then moved to the Parabis group, working as a manager in their personal injury department.

After a brief career in acting and modelling, the area of law that she eventually focused on is civil law. She then took a career-break following the birth of her two children in quick succession. Hussain then moved from Croydon to the North West as a single mother with two young children and secured a Board Directorship with a Manchester-based Regeneration Initiative, working alongside Manchester City Council, the Home Office and Paul Boateng MP (among others) on projects addressing the issues faced by black and ethnic minority communities to encourage stronger integration into mainstream community activities in areas such as business, health, education and crime-prevention measures. In the meantime, She also owned and ran her own legal practice in South Cheshire.

On completion of this role, Hussain went back to working as a solicitor for a small South London firm which rapidly grew into one of the largest legal conglomerates in the UK. She was promoted to senior manager level, with her career progression culminating in her being asked to participate in a major project involving the successful collaboration between her law firm and an internationally renowned insurance company.

In 2010, Hussain closed her legal practise after four years, and took up the role of hosting a local radio show Health and Healing with Mumtaz on RedShift Radio. She does this twice weekly and introduces and discusses aspects of health and spirituality and well-being. In the same year, she began specialising in business development in the media and broadcasting arena.

In October 2012, she joined Pannone. She is a solicitor and Business Development Manager for the Connect2Law, which is a referral and support network for law firms across the UK, established by Pannone in 2001.

Recognition
In 2011, Hussain was selected as one of 50 women in Manchester "Most Likely to Make an Impact".

Personal life
Hussain is a single mother, and has lived and worked in London and Manchester. Hussain married a man of Pakistani-Iranian descent when she was young. She has a daughter, Yasmeen (born 1994), and a son, Jahan (born 1996). In 1998, she divorced her husband. She later married an English man named James Cameron in 2001.

Hussain is a mentor for 15 and 16-year-old girls, as part of an initiative to highlight the varied career and lifestyle options that are available to young teenagers who may not have this information easily available to them. She has also spoken before an invited audience of the need to support victims of domestic aggression and supports projects that seek to eradicate this.

See also
 British Bangladeshi
 List of British Bangladeshis

References

Living people
Year of birth missing (living people)
English Muslims
English people of Bangladeshi descent
Radio presenters from London
English female models
20th-century English actresses
English actresses of South Asian descent
English women in business
People from Croydon
Lawyers from Manchester
British women radio presenters